IZair (İzmir Hava Yolları) was an airline headquartered on the grounds of Adnan Menderes Airport in İzmir, Turkey.

History
The airline was established in 2005 as İzmir Hava Yolları by a group of businessmen from İzmir. It started operations on 14 June 2006.

Starting in 2012, all IZair flights were marketed under the Air Berlin Turkey brand, a cooperation between Air Berlin and Pegasus Airlines. The cooperation was discontinued in 2013, with the brand itself being abandoned.

On 29 February 2012 the last remaining Airbus A319-100 was returned to the lessor.

In November 2018, it has been announced that IZair will be dissolved and merged into Pegasus Airlines by the end of 2018.

Destinations 
IZair flew both domestic and international destinations, with all international destinations being to Europe.

Fleet

The IZair fleet consisted of the following aircraft, all of which were operated for Pegasus Airlines (as of February 2020):

Incidents and accidents
 On 10 March 2010, Pegasus Airlines Flight 361, an Airbus A319-100 operated by IZair on a ferry flight made an emergency landing at Frankfurt Airport in Germany after a malfunction in the nose gear. The flight landed safely but blew both front nose gear tires. The airport closed runway 07R/25L for 3 hours to allow recovery. The nose gear suffered the same problem as JetBlue Flight 292.

References

External links

Official website 
Official website 

Defunct airlines of Turkey
Airlines established in 2005
Airlines disestablished in 2018
2005 establishments in Turkey
Economy of İzmir
Companies based in İzmir